Gertrude Sandmann (16 November 1893 – 6 January 1981) was a German artist and Holocaust survivor.
 
Born into a wealthy German-Jewish family, Sandmann studied at the Verein der Berliner Künstlerinnen and had private tutelage from Käthe Kollwitz. In 1935 she was banned from practicing her profession due to the Nuremberg Laws. Given a deportation order in 1942, she ignored it, faked her own suicide, and hid with friends in Berlin until the end of the war. She lived in an apartment in Berlin-Schöneberg until the end of her life.

She was a lesbian and, after the war, worked to improve the rights and visibility of LGBT people.

References

Further reading

External links
 

20th-century German Jews
Holocaust survivors
Jewish artists
Lesbian Jews
German lesbian artists
German LGBT rights activists
Artists from Berlin
1893 births
1981 deaths
20th-century German LGBT people